Tania Murray Li is a Professor of Anthropology at the University of Toronto who is known for her work on labour, capitalism, development, politics and indigeneity with a particular focus on Indonesia. She is an elected member of the Royal Society of Canada.

Education and career 
Li has a B.A. (1981) and a Ph.D. (1987) from Cambridge University. After her Ph.D. Li moved to Dalhousie University where she reached the level of professor in 2002. In 2004 she moved to the University of Toronto where, in 2020, she was professor and tier one Canada Research Chair.

Research 
Li's early research centered on Singapore where she worked on urban politics.From 1986 until 1989 Lie worked on an environmental management project a  Dalhousie University, and in a 2017 interview she described how the goals of "knowledge transfer and institution-building" made her uncomfortable.

Subsequently she worked on issues within Indonesia, particularly on the culture, environmental, and economic issues of the region. She works with non-governmental organizations in Indonesia, and brings people with her, including activists, for her field research in the area.

Selected publications

Awards and honors 
In 2015 she was named a fellow of the Royal Society of Canada. In 2019 she was named a fellow of the Royal Anthropological Institute.

Li's book Land's End won the Senior Book Prize from the American Ethnological Association in 2016, and the George McT. Kahin Prize prize from the Association for Asian Studies in 2017.

References

External links 
 

Living people
Alumni of the University of Cambridge
Academic staff of the University of Toronto
Canadian anthropologists
Fellows of the Royal Society of Canada
Fellows of the Royal Anthropological Institute of Great Britain and Ireland
Cultural anthropologists
Year of birth missing (living people)